John Mark (16 August 1925 – 8 December 1991) was a British track and field sprinter, best known for lighting the Olympic flame at the 1948 Summer Olympics in London.

Biography
John Mark was educated at Cranleigh School where he excelled at athletics, and won a place to study at the University of Cambridge. Whilst at Cambridge he was a noted athlete and rugby forward, though missed out on achieving his Blue due to injury. He served as president of the Cambridge University Athletic Club.

In 1947 Mark finished fourth in the AAA 440 yards and was selected to represent the United Kingdom in the 400 metres in Paris. He also won two AAA silver medals in the relay.

In late 1947, he was already on the British shortlist for selection for the 400 metres at the forthcoming London Olympics, when his Olympian good looks led to his being chosen to light the Olympic flame at the opening of the games. Thus on 29 July 1948 he carried the heavy Olympic torch on the final leg of its journey into Wembley Stadium and lit the flame in its specially-designed bowl.

Following the Olympics, Mark worked as a GP in a rural practice in Liss in Hampshire until his retirement. He died of a stroke.

References

External links

1925 births
1991 deaths
People educated at Cranleigh School
Olympic cauldron lighters
British male sprinters
English male sprinters